Billboard Top Hits: 1989 is a compilation album released by Rhino Records in 1994, featuring ten hit recordings from 1989.

The track lineup includes seven songs that reached the top of the Billboard Hot 100 chart. The remaining three songs all reached the top five of the chart.

Track listing

Track information and credits taken from the album's liner notes.

References

1994 compilation albums
Billboard Top Hits albums